Jimmy Connors was the defending champion, but lost in the quarterfinals this year.

Roscoe Tanner won the title, defeating Wojtek Fibak, 6–2, 7–6, 7–5 in the final.

Seeds

Draw

Finals

Top half

Section 1

Section 2

Bottom half

Section 3

Section 4

References

 Main Draw

U.S. Pro Indoor
1981 Grand Prix (tennis)